Bratsky District is an administrative district, one of the thirty-three in Irkutsk Oblast, Russia. Municipally, it is incorporated as Bratsky Municipal District. It is located in the northwest of the oblast. Its administrative center is the city of Bratsk (which is not administratively a part of the district). Population:  65,240 (2002 Census);

Administrative and municipal status
Within the framework of administrative divisions, Bratsky District is one of the thirty-three in the oblast. The city of Bratsk serves as its administrative center, despite being incorporated separately as an administrative unit with the status equal to that of the districts.

As a municipal division, the district is incorporated as Bratsky Municipal District. The City of Bratsk is incorporated separately from the district as Bratsk Urban Okrug.

References

Notes

Sources

Registry of the Administrative-Territorial Formations of Irkutsk Oblast 

Districts of Irkutsk Oblast
